The Society of Ticket Agents and Retailers (STAR) is a United Kingdom body formed to provide self-regulation within the live event ticket sales industry. STAR's aim is to ensure consumer confidence in the sale of event tickets and its members are required to comply with a code of practice.

Since its creation in 1997, STAR has encouraged high standards of service and reassuring the public that they are buying from a reputable ticket seller when they deal with a STAR member. It has received tremendous support from organisations, venues, producers and promoters across the country for its work in combatting ticket fraud and making ticket buying safer for all. STAR’s members now represent over 90% of theatre and music ticket sales (over a million tickets per week).

Code of practice
The code of practice covers all aspects of ticket retailing however it can be summarised in five main tenets:
 Provide clear pricing information for tickets in line with the requirements of the STAR Code.
 Handle bookings politely and courteously, giving the highest standards of professional service.
 Refund at least the face value of the ticket if an event is cancelled and the event organiser enables and authorises refunds.
 Highlight any terms and conditions, including transferability, cancellation and viewing restrictions.
 To provide an Alternative Dispute Resolution service for customers who have bought from STAR members.

The STAR Administration

The administration of STAR is operated by a Council, which is elected by STAR members, and led by a Chairperson. Day-to-day operations are managed and carried out by STAR’s Chief Executive and External Relations professionals, who ensure the operation of the Code of Practice, handle all dispute resolution enquiries as well as provide information and advice around best practices for safe ticket buying. STAR is funded by annual contributions from its membership.

Breach of the Code of Practice

If a member breaches the Code of Practice, a sub-committee examines the breach and disciplines the member if necessary and depending on the seriousness of the infringement. The most serious cases could lead to expulsion from the STAR membership. 

The sub-committee includes members of the STAR Council, independent professionals and the Chair. Anyone with a business interest in the case at hand is not eligible to vote on anything related to that case.

Alternative Dispute Resolution

The Society of Ticket Agents and Retailers (STAR) works to help resolve disputes between its members and ticket buyers and is approved by Government under the Alternative Dispute Resolution for Consumer Disputes (Competent Authorities and Information) Regulations 2015. The competent authority for this approval and that audits STAR’s ADR service is the Chartered Trading Standards Institute. ADR is available for customers who have an unresolved problem following their purchase from a STAR member. 

A dispute resolution request can be submitted by either a customer or by a STAR member. Conciliation then takes place through the STAR office in an effort to reach a satisfactory resolution.

OFT report
In June 2004 the Office of Fair Trading announced it would be carrying out a fact-finding study into ticket agents for entertainment and sporting events in the UK. The report was published in January 2005 and whilst it concluded that "most consumers were happy with their last ticket purchase" it did recommend that "the Society of Ticket Agents and Retailers produce model terms for its  members to use in their consumer contacts".  STAR subsequently published model terms in July 2009.

Full Members of S.T.A.R.
 ACC Liverpool
 Adelphi Theatre
 AKA
 Albemarle of London Ltd
 Aldwych Theatre
 Almeida Theatre
 alt-tickets (DHP Family Ltd)
 Ambassadors Theatre
 Apollo Theatre
 Apollo Victoria
 Arts Club Liverpool
 ATG Tickets
 Audience View
 AXS
 Aylesbury Waterside Theatre
 Beautiful Tickets
 Beck Theatre
 Best of Theatre (London Box Office)
 Big Green Coach Planet Festival
 Booking Protect Ltd
 Box Office
 Bridge Theatre
 Brighton Centre
 Bristol Hippodrome (ATG)
 Bristol Old Vic
 Cambridge Theatre
 Cameron Mackintosh Limited
 CheapTheatreTickets.com
 Chichester Festival Theatre
 Churchill Theatre
 City Varieties Music Hall
 Covent Garden Box Office
 Crewe Lyceum
 Criterion Theatre
 Delfont Mackintosh Theatres
 DICE FM
 Donmar Warehouse
 Duchess Theatre
 Duke of York’s Theatre
 Edinburgh Festival Fringe Society
 Edinburgh Playhouse
 Empire Theatre
 Encore Tickets Ltd
 English National Opera London Coliseum
 Eventim UK Ltd
 Family Tickets Ltd
 Fever
 Fortune Theatre
 fromtheboxoffice.com
 G Live
 Garrick Theatre
 Gielgud Theatre
 Gigantic Tickets Limited
 Gigs and Tours
 Grand Opera House
 Group Line (part of ATG)
 Harold Pinter Theatre
 Her Majesty’s Theatre
 HQ Theatres Ltd
 Hyde Park Picture House
 JM Marketing Limited
 Kaboodle Solutions Ltd
 Kilimanjaro Live Ltd
 King’s Theatre
 KX Tickets
 Leas Cliff Hall
 Leeds Grand Theatre
 Leicester Square Box Office
 Line Up
 Live Nation
 London Box Office (Best of Theatre)
 London Coliseum English National Opera
 London Palladium
 London Theatre
 London Theatre Direct
 lovetheatre.com (part of The Ticket Machine Group)
 LW Theatres
 Lyceum Theatre
 Lyric Hammersmith
 Lyric Theatre
 Mamma Mia! The Party
 M&S Bank Arena
 Merlinsoft Ltd
 Milton Keynes Theatre
 Motorpoint Arena Cardiff
 Motorpoint Arena Nottingham
 Motorsport Tickets
 Music Plus Sport Limited
 National Arenas Association
 National Theatre
 Nederlander Dominion Limited
 New Alexandra Theatre (ATG)
 New London Theatre
 New Theatre (ATG)
 New Theatre Royal Lincoln
 New Victoria Theatre (ATG)
 New Wimbledon Theatre and Studio (ATG)
 Nimax Theatres
 Noel Coward Theatre
 Novello Theatre
 Nuffield Southampton Theatres
 O2 Academy, Academy 2 and Academy 3 Birmingham
 O2 Academy, Academy 2 and The Scholar Leicester
 O2 Academy and Academy 2 Bristol
 O2 Academy and Academy 2 Glasgow
 O2 Academy and Academy 2 Islington
 O2 Academy and Academy 2 Liverpool
 O2 Academy and Academy 2 Newcastle
 O2 Academy and Academy 2 Oxford
 O2 Academy and Academy 2 Sheffield
 O2 Academy and Academy 2 Leeds
 O2 Academy and Academy 2 Bournemouth
 O2 Academy and Academy 2 Brixton
 O2 Apollo Manchester
 O2 Forum Kentish Town
 O2 Guildhall Southampton
 O2 Institute Birmingham
 O2 Ritz Manchester
 O2 Shepherds Bush Empire
 O2 Victoria Warehouse Manchester
 Official London Theatre
 Opera House Manchester
 Opera North
 Orchard Theatre
 Oxford Playhouse
 Palace Theatre 
 Phoenix Theatre 
 Piccadilly Theatre
 Playhouse Theatre 
 Prince Edward Theatre
 Prince of Wales Theatre
 Princess Theatre
 Quaytickets
 Queens Theatre
 Red61
 Regent Theatre
 Resorts World Arena
 Richmond Theatre
 Royal Albert Hall
 Royal Opera House
 Royal Shakespeare Company
 Sadlers Wells
 Santa Pod Raceway
 Savoy Theatre
 Scottish Exhibition and Conference Centre
 Scottish Exhibition and Conference Centre SECC (Ovo Hydro)
 SeatGeek
 Seat Plan
 See Tickets
 Shaftesbury Theatre
 Sheffield City Hall
 Shows in London
 SIV 
 SJM Concerts Ltd
 Society of London Theatre
 Sound Travel Group Ltd
 Southend Theatres
 Spektrix Ltd
 Squire Patton Boggs UK LLP
 St Martin’s Theatre
 Stephen Joseph Theatre
 Stockton Globe
 Sunderland Empire
 Tessitura Network
 The FA
 The Lowry Lyric Quays and Studio Theatres
 The Old Vic Theatre
 The Royal Edinburgh Military Tattoo
 The Rugby Football Union
 The SSE Arena Wembley
 The Ticket Factory
 The Ticket Store
 Theatre Royal Brighton
 Theatre Royal Drury Lane
 Theatre Royal Glasgow
 Theatrebookings.com (part of Leicester Square Box Office)
 Theatre Tickets Direct Ltd (see also www.uktheatretickets.co.uk)
 Theatreland Ltd
 theatremonkey.com
 theatretickets.london
 Ticket Quarter
 Ticket Text Limited
 TicketCo UK Ltd
 Ticketek UK Ltd
 Ticketing Business Forum
 Ticketing Professionals Conference
 Ticketline
 Ticketmaster Sport
 Ticketmaster UK Ltd
 TicketPlan Limited
 Tickets Scotland
 TicketSource
 Ticketswap UK Ltd
 TicketWeb (UK) Ltd
 Tix Ticketing
 Tixel UK Ltd
 TixTrack
 TKTS
 TodayTix Ltd
 Tungate Group
 Twickenham Stadium
 Twickets Ltd
 TYG Limited
 UK Theatre
 Universe
 Utilita Arena, Birmingham
 Utilita Arena Sheffield
 Vaudeville Theatre
 Victoria Hall
 Victoria Palace
 Vivaticket Ltd
 Walt Disney Theatrical UK Ltd
 Watford Palace Theatre
 WeGotTickets
 Wembley Stadium
 White Rock Theatre
 www.uktheatretickets.co.uk (see also Theatre Tickets Direct)
 Wycombe Swan
 Wyndhams Theatre
 Wyvern Theatre and Swindon Arts Centre
York Theatre Royal

Ticket Fraud Awareness

STAR has collaborated with Action Fraud, the National Fraud and Cyber Crime Reporting Centre (part of the City of London Police) to raise awareness around ticket fraud and provide best practices for customers to buy event tickets safely and with confidence. 

The most recent campaign was carried out in April 2022, encouraging consumers to purchase their tickets from STAR members to ensure they are buying from a legitimate source.

STAR is actively promoting safe ticket buying and provides advice on its website to prevent consumers from becoming victims of ticket fraud. 

Additionally, an independent review of consumer protection measures in ticketing was published by the UK Government in May 2016. This review took place as a requirement of the Consumer Rights Act 2015 and was conducted by Michael Waterson, an economics professor at Warwick University.

References

External links
The STAR website
Theatremonkey guide to STAR members
Questions for consumers to consider when buying tickets by the Office of Fair Trading
STAR Model Terms and Conditions
Chartered Trading Standards Institute - ADR Approved Bodies
Action Fraud - Ticket Fraud Awareness Campaign 2022
Action Fraud - Ticket Fraud Awareness Campaign 2019
Action Fraud - Ticket Fraud Awareness
STAR's safe ticket buying advice
Inquiry into the Impact of Covid-19 on DCMS Sectors by STAR

Society of Ticket Agents and retailers (STAR)
Self-regulatory organisations in the United Kingdom
Tickets